A jewellery store (American English: jewelry store) is a retail business establishment, that specializes in selling (and also buying) jewellery and watches. Jewellery stores provide many services such as repairs, remodeling, restoring, designing and manufacturing pieces.

References

Jewellery
Retailers by type of merchandise sold